Manju Bhargavi (born 1955) is an actress and dancer, best known for her performance in the Telugu blockbusters, Nayakudu Vinayakudu (1980) and Sankarabharanam (1980), which both released in the same year, just a day apart.

Early life
Manju Bhargavi parents originally hailed from Andhra Pradesh but settled in Madras. After marriage she settled in Bengaluru.

Career

She was trained as a classical dancer and performed at many dance shows.  At one of these shows, filmmaker Prakash Rao saw her and cast her in a dance sequence for the Telugu film Gaalipataalu (1974).  It led to dance numbers in hit films Krishnaveni (1974), Soggadu (1975) and Yamagola (1977).  She was also seen as a vamp in Nayakudu Vinayakudu opposite ANR and Jayalalitha.  She was then cast in the film President Peramma where she performed a dance number, and then the film's director K. Vishwanath asked her to submit some photographs where she wasn't wearing any make-up.  She complied and he liked the results and cast her in the lead role as an unglamorous dancer in his next film Sankarabharanam (1979), a film that broke box office records and became a landmark in Telugu cinema. Besides the dubbed version of Sankarabharanam, she has acted in some landmark Malayalam movies too. She has done a Tamil movie song in "BILLA" 1980 as well as a cameo in the famous classical dance sequence with Kamal Haasan in the movie Saagara Sangamam in 1983. Although, she was very satisfied with the film as it gave her fame and respect, she didn't get many roles in films after that her height being the reason, but she choose to concentrate on her dance programs and running the dance school. Ones of her disciples is Deepa Sashindran.

Family
Her husband is the son of a retired Chief Secretary. His family is also originally from Andhra Pradesh but later settled in Bangalore, which is where she currently lives.  She had two sons, but one of her sons died of cancer in 2007.  She runs a dance school in Bangalore, and because of that and her dance shows, she doesn't have much time to act in films, taking an occasional role when it fits into her busy schedule.  In 2008, she made her Kannada film debut in Hatrick Hodi Maga playing Shivaraj Kumar's mother.

She had acted as Subbulakshmi in the popular TV serial Thangam on Sun TV.

Filmography

Tamil
 Tripura Sundari (1978)
 Gandharva Kanni (1979)
 Devi Dharisanam (1980)
 Yamanukku Yaman (1980)
 Billa (1980)
 Bala Nagamma (1981)
 Mamiyara Marumagala (1982)
 Magane Magane (1982)
 Sringaram (2007)

Malayalam
 Devi Kanyakumari (1974)
 Pulivalu (1975)
 Njavalppazhangal (1976)
 Saritha (1977)
 Sathrathil Oru Raathri (1978)
 Sankarabharanam (1979) - Dubbed

Telugu
 Krishnaveni (1974)
Soggadu (1976)
 Yamagola (1979)
 Anthuleni Vintha Katha (1979)
 Kothala Raayudu (1979)
 Sankarabharanam (1980)
 Kodallu Vastunnaru Jagratha (1980)
 Bala Nagamma (1981)
 Prema Simhasanam (1981)
 Sagara Sangamam (1983)
 Yamaleela (1994)
 ' 'Mummy Me Ayanochadu' ' (1995) 
 Jabilamma Pelli (1996)
 Ninne Pelladata (1996)
 Pournami (2006)
 Shakti (2011)
 Attack (2016)
 LAW : Love and War (2019)

Kannada
 Hatrick Hodi Maga (2009)

Television

Telugu
 Yamaleela - Aa Taruvatha (2020–2022)
 Ammaku Teliyani Koilamma(2021)

Tamil
 Thangam (2009-2013)

References

 http://www.manjubarggavee.com/

Actresses in Telugu cinema
Indian film actresses
Actresses from Andhra Pradesh
Living people
1950 births
20th-century Indian actresses
Actresses from Chennai
Recipients of the Rajyotsava Award 2004
Actresses in Malayalam cinema
Actresses in Tamil cinema
Performers of Indian classical dance
Dancers from Andhra Pradesh
Indian female classical dancers
Kuchipudi exponents
Recipients of the Sangeet Natak Akademi Award
20th-century Indian dancers